Los Angeles Trade–Technical College (L.A. Trade–Tech, LATTC) is a public community college in Los Angeles, California. It is part of the Los Angeles Community College District and is accredited by the Accrediting Commission for Community and Junior Colleges (ACCJC), American Culinary Federation, and League of Nursing, among others.

About 

The 25-acre campus is located just south of the Historic Core of Los Angeles.

History
Founded as the Frank Wiggins Trade School in 1925, the college is the oldest of the nine campuses of the Los Angeles Community College District. 

After World War II, the school moved to the former campus of John H. Francis Polytechnical High School, which had relocated to Sun Valley. It then expanded the campus and combined with Metropolitan College to expand its programs.

In 1954, the school was renamed Los Angeles Trade–Technical Junior College. In 1969, the college became a part of the Los Angeles Community College District.

L.A. Trade Tech's fashion design program is the oldest in Los Angeles, having started in 1925. During World War Two, the college offered around-the-clock courses so women could train in vocational areas to help the war effort.

The college was featured on the PBS television series Downtown with Huell Howser.

Campus modernization
The campus is currently in the midst of a multimillion-dollar modernization and revitalization project.  Two new buildings have been constructed, a student services building and a technology building that will include new lecture halls, classrooms, computer labs and faculty offices.

The in-state tuition and fees for 2017-2018 were $1,220, and out-of-state tuition and fees were $7,538. There is no application fee. The school utilizes a semester-based academic year. The student-faculty ratio is 21-to-1. Total enrollment of 12,984. Full-time 2,964 and part-time 10,020 students.

Notable alumni

 Lester Oliver Bankhead (1912–1997), architect, attended in around 1945, and known for church architecture in Los Angeles, California
 Don Campbell (1951–2020), creator of the hip-hop dance style called locking
 Carole Little (c. 1935–2015), clothing designer
 Matthew G. Martínez (1929–2011), United States House of Representatives member
 Allan McCollum (born 1944), New York City-based contemporary artist
 Rick Owens (born 1962), fashion designer, owner of the Rick Owens clothing label
 Jeffrey Sebelia, fashion designer, winner of Project Runway Season 3, and founder of the clothing label "Cosa Nostra"
 Tadashi Shoji (born 1948), Japanese-American fashion designer, and owner of Tadashi Shoji and T by Tadashi clothing labels

See also
California Community Colleges System

References

External links

California Community Colleges
Educational institutions established in 1925
Schools accredited by the Western Association of Schools and Colleges
Universities and colleges in Los Angeles
Fashion merchandising
Two-year colleges in the United States
Fashion design
1925 establishments in California